In Turkey, the General Directorate of Customs Protection is a special law enforcement agency responsible for controlling international transports to the country, checking goods and passenger movements, and enforcing laws that prevent economical losses due to smuggling offenses.

Ranks 
The system of the Customs Protection consists of a total of four ranks.

List of general managers 
 Major general Seyfi Düzgören (1932–1939)
 Major general Lütfü Karapınar (1939–1943)
 Major general Emin Çınar (1943–1947)
 Major general Abdülhalim Oruz (1948–1949)
 Major general Mümtaz Ulusoy (1949–1952)
 Major general Muhittin Salur (1952–1953)
 Lieutenant general Hayati Ataker (1955–1956)
 Tayyip İlter (1957–1971)
 Kemal Günel (1971–1975)
 Rıfat Ergun (1975–1976)
 Hayrettin Hanağası (1976–1977)
 Sıtkı Kadakal (1977–1978)
 Hayrettin Hanağası (1978–1984)
 Alper Özarslan (1984–1993)
 Şahin Sezer (1993–1994)
 Bahri Öktem (1994–1995)
 Şahin Sezer (1995–2000)
 Ünal Gökalp (acting) (2000)
 Hakkı Teke (acting) (2000–2003)
 Cihan Ancın (2003–2005)
 Dr. Ali Yılmaz (acting) (2005)
 Ramazan Ulus (acting) (2005–2006)
 Cemil Emre (acting) (2006)
 Ali Nural (acting) (2006–2007)
 Hayrettin Cevher (acting) (2007–2008)
 Neşet Akkoç (2007–2011)
 Yusuf Güney (2011–2013)
 Abdullah Soylu (2013–2019)
 Murat Yaman (2019–)

Kaynakça

External links 
 

Law enforcement in Turkey